Frankie Sodano (March 10, 1931 – May 11, 2015) was an American boxer. He competed in the men's flyweight event at the 1948 Summer Olympics. At the 1948 Summer Olympics, he defeated Rabin Bhatta of India, before losing to František Majdloch of Czechoslovakia.

References

1931 births
2015 deaths
American male boxers
Olympic boxers of the United States
Boxers at the 1948 Summer Olympics
Boxers from Philadelphia
Flyweight boxers